Callum Wilson (born 29 February 2004) is a professional footballer who plays as a defender for Championship side Sunderland. Born in England, he represents Northern Ireland at youth international level.

Club career
Wilson began his career playing Saturday league football for AFC Telford United's academy. In 2016, he moved to the youth setup at Derby County at under-13 level. Wilson remained with Derby until under-16 level when he made the move to League One club Shrewsbury Town. Wilson made his senior debut for the club, whilst a first-year scholar, on 5 October 2021, starting in an EFL Trophy match against Wolverhampton Wanderers U21s. On 19 October, Wilson was an unused substitute in a League One match away at Oxford United, which Shrewsbury lost 2–0.

In July 2022, Wilson joined newly-promoted Championship side Sunderland on a two-year deal.

International career
On 17 March 2022, Wilson was called up to the Northern Ireland under-18 team, whom he qualifies for through his father. Wilson made his international debut in a 2-0 loss to Belgium U18.

Career statistics

Club

References

External links

2004 births
Living people
English footballers
Association football defenders
Shrewsbury Town F.C. players